Big hART is an Australian arts and social-justice company based in Tasmania.

History
Big hART was founded in 1992 by playwright and director Scott Rankin and John Bakes in Burnie, north-western Tasmania, with the aim of countering disadvantage and a spike in crime following mill closures in the town.

Work
The company initiates large scale, long-term community cultural development projects in disadvantaged communities in urban, regional and remote Australia. Projects are task-focused and are to increase social, cultural and economic participation for community members following a three-step model approach.

Projects
Projects by Big hART include, among others:
Museum of the Long Weekend (Canberra 2013).
Yijala Yala (Roebourne, 2010–).
Namatjira (Ntaria, 2009–) .
Smashed (Tasmania, 2010).
Nyuntu Ngali (Ernabella/ Alice Springs, 2009)
Ngapartji Ngapartji (Alice Springs and surrounds, NT & SA, 2004–2009)
Gold (NSW, 2006–2009)
Northcott Narratives (Surry Hills – Sydney, 2003–2007).
Drive (Tasmania, 2008–2009).
Love Zombies (Tasmania, 2009)
This is Living (Tasmania, 2007–2008).
Drive in Holiday & Radio Holiday (North West Tasmania, 2005–2009).
Lucky
Junk Theory (Cronulla Shire – Sydney, 2006–2009).
Nuff Stuff (Groote Eylandt, Tennant Creek and Tiwi Islands, 2006)
Knot@Home (NSW, Vic and Tasmania, 2001–2004).
Hurt (NSW, Vic and Tasmania).

Awards

Ngapartji Ngapartji
Deadly Awards 2008 – Winner, Most Outstanding Achievement in Film, TV and Theatre
 Sydney Theatre Awards 2008 – Winner, Best Lead Man Trevor Jamieson
 Sydney Theatre Awards 2008 – Nominee, Best Mainstage Production
 Sydney Theatre Awards 2008 – Nominee, Best Direction
 NT Innovation Awards 2008 Finalist

References

External links

Culture of Tasmania
Community development organizations
Australian documentary filmmakers
Theatre companies in Australia
Organisations based in Tasmania
Indigenous Australians in Tasmania
Australian Aboriginal languages